Man Kok Tsui is the name of a cape and a nearby village of Lantau Island, Hong Kong.

Administration
Man Kok Tsui is a recognized village under the New Territories Small House Policy.

Geography
Man Kok Tsui is located south of Kau Shat Wan.

References

Further reading

External links

 Delineation of area of existing village Man Kok Tsui (Mui Wo) for election of resident representative (2019 to 2022)

Villages in Islands District, Hong Kong
Lantau Island